Hoseynabad (also Romanized as Ḩoseynābād and Hosein Abad; also known as Husainābād and Khoseynabad) is a village in Mavazekhan-e Shomali Rural District, Khvajeh District, Heris County, East Azerbaijan Province, Iran. At the 2006 census, its population was 32, in 7 families.

References 

Populated places in Heris County